Natale Spinello (born 15 December 1947) is an Italian rower. He competed in the men's coxless four event at the 1976 Summer Olympics.

References

External links
 

1947 births
Living people
Italian male rowers
Olympic rowers of Italy
Rowers at the 1976 Summer Olympics
Sportspeople from the Province of Padua